Garip Island is a small (88 acres) island off the coast of Dikili ilçe in İzmir Province, Turkey. It is one of two small islands, together called the Garip Islands, at the cut point of Dikili's Bademli Bay. Both islands face the Greek island of Lesbos.

In antiquity these islands, along with a third island that has now joined the mainland, were known as the Arginusae; they were the site of the Battle of Arginusae in 406 BC.

Offered for sale under a single title deed in 2006, the islands were sold to a Turkish development group in 2010. No construction was undertaken on the islands.

References

External links
Islands for Sale

Islands of Turkey
Islands of İzmir Province
Dikili District